Gastrotheca ossilaginis is a species of frog in the family Hemiphractidae.
It is endemic to Peru.
Its natural habitats are subtropical or tropical moist montane forests and pastureland.

References

Gastrotheca
Amphibians of Peru
Amphibians of the Andes
Taxonomy articles created by Polbot
Amphibians described in 2005